Crockett County is a county located on the Edwards Plateau in the U.S. state of Texas. As of the 2020 census, its population was 3,098. The county seat is Ozona. The county was founded in 1875 and later organized in 1891. It is named in honor of Davy Crockett, the legendary frontiersman who died at the Battle of the Alamo.

History

 Prehistoric people lived in Gobbler Shelter, located on a small tributary canyon of Live Oak Creek. Earliest known Native American tribes are Tonkawa, Lipan Apache, and Comanche.
 1590 Spanish explorer Gaspar Castaño de Sosa leads a mining expedition of 170 who pass through the western section of Crockett County to reach the Pecos River.
 1684, May 22 - Juan Domínguez de Mendoza and his expedition cross the Pecos River and camp at San Pantaleón.
 1849 John Coffee Hays expedition charting waterholes for transporting people and freight.
 1852 U. S. Army Colonel Joseph K. Mansfield recommends establishing a new post on Live Oak Creek to protect travelers.
 1855, August 20,  Fort Lancaster is established in response to Mansfield's recommendation.
 1866 The Texas legislature provides three battalions of Texas Rangers to protect settlers in the area.
 1868 Camp Melvin established.
 1875, January 12 - Crockett County, named for Davy Crockett, is formed from Bexar County.
 1880s Sheep and cattle ranchers establish themselves in the county. Kirkpatrick Hotel built to serve stagecoach passengers and cowboys.
 1885 W. P. Hoover becomes one of the first settlers, on the Pecos River. Crockett County becomes a subsidiary of Val Verde County.
 1887 Crockett County is further reduced as Sutton and Schleicher counties are formed from it.
 1889 Emerald becomes first town in Crockett County.
 1891 Crockett County is  organized. Ozona becomes the county seat. The first water well is drilled at the First Baptist Church in Ozona.
 1900 Stagecoach service begins in Crockett County. County reports seven manufacturing firms.
 1902 Crockett County Courthouse built, Empire style, architect Oscar Ruffini. The building does multiple duty for courtroom and county offices, as well as a community center and dance hall.
 1925 First producing oil well within the World oil field, on L. P. Powell's ranch in north central Crockett County, by Chester R. Bunker's World Oil Company.
 1938 Ozona erects a statue of Davy Crockett in the town square.
 1939 Ozona opens the Crockett County Museum. In 1958, it was moved to its current location on the town square.

Geography

Major highways
  Interstate 10
  U.S. Highway 190
  State Highway 137
  State Highway 163
  State Highway 349

Adjacent counties

 Upton County (north)
 Reagan County (north)
 Irion County (northeast)
 Schleicher County (east)
 Sutton County (east)
 Val Verde County (south)
 Terrell County (south)
 Pecos County (west)
 Crane County (northwest)

Crockett County is among the few counties in the United States to border as many as nine counties.

Demographics

Note: the US Census treats Hispanic/Latino as an ethnic category. This table excludes Latinos from the racial categories and assigns them to a separate category. Hispanics/Latinos can be of any race.

As of the census of 2000, there were 4,099 people, 1,524 households, and 1,114 families residing in the county. The population density was 1.46 people per square mile (0.56/km2). There were 2,049 housing units at an average density of 0.73 per square mile (0.28/km2). The racial makeup of the county was 76.34% White, 0.68% Black or African American, 0.59% Native American, 0.27% Asian, 0.02% Pacific Islander, 19.71% from other races, and 2.39% from two or more races. 54.70% of the population were Hispanic or Latino of any race.

There were 1,524 households, out of which 36.50% had children under the age of 18 living with them, 60.30% were married couples living together, 9.30% had a female householder with no husband present, and 26.90% were non-families. 24.70% of all households were made up of individuals, and 11.80% had someone living alone who was 65 years of age or older. The average household size was 2.65 and the average family size was 3.19.

In the county, the population was spread out, with 28.90% under the age of 18, 7.10% from 18 to 24, 26.40% from 25 to 44, 24.70% from 45 to 64, and 12.90% who were 65 years of age or older. The median age was 37 years. For every 100 females there were 98.20 males. For every 100 females age 18 and over, there were 97.60 males.

The median income for a household in the county was $29,355, and the median income for a family was $34,653. Males had a median income of $29,925 versus $14,695 for females. The per capita income for the county was $14,414. About 14.90% of families and 19.40% of the population were below the poverty line, including 24.30% of those under age 18 and 18.20% of those age 65 or over.

Communities

Census-designated place
 Ozona (county seat)

Ghost town
 Emerald

Politics

See also

 List of museums in Central Texas
 National Register of Historic Places listings in Crockett County, Texas
 Recorded Texas Historic Landmarks in Crockett County

References

External links
 Crockett County in Handbook of Texas Online at the University of Texas
 Inventory of county records, Crockett County courthouse, Ozona, Texas, hosted by the Portal to Texas History

 
1891 establishments in Texas
Populated places established in 1891
Texas Hill Country
Davy Crockett
Majority-minority counties in Texas